Clemenson is a surname. Notable people with the surname include: 

Brian Clemenson (born 1963), English greyhound trainer
Christian Clemenson (born 1958), American actor

See also
 Clementson (surname)

Americanized surnames
Patronymic surnames
Surnames from given names